Camilla Strandskog (born 4 December 1984), is a Norwegian politician for the Conservative Party.

She served as a deputy representative to the Parliament of Norway from Oslo during the terms 2013–2017 and 2017–2021. From 2015 to 2018 she was a part of Solberg's Cabinet as political adviser in the Ministry of Trade and Fisheries.

References

1984 births
Living people
Politicians from Oslo
Deputy members of the Storting
Conservative Party (Norway) politicians
Norwegian women in politics
Women members of the Storting
21st-century Norwegian politicians